The Two Oceans Marathon is a 56 km / 35-mile ultramarathon and 21 km half-marathon held annually in Cape Town, South Africa on the Saturday of the Easter weekend.

Known globally as "the world's most beautiful marathon", the race is run against a backdrop of spectacular scenery through the Cape Peninsula.

Both races start in Newlands.  The Ultra Marathon follows a more or less circular route through Muizenberg, Fish Hoek, over Chapman's Peak, through Hout Bay and Constantia Nek, and eventually finishes at the University of Cape Town campus. On occasions when Chapman's Peak Drive has been closed due to construction or rock falls, the Ultra Marathon has followed an alternative route over Ou Kaapse Weg.

The Half Marathon takes runners along Edinburgh Drive (the M3 highway), before turning into forest roads past Kirstenbosch (where runners meet up with Ultra Marathon participants) and finishing at the University of Cape Town campus.

Since its inaugural edition in 1970, the event has grown. Selling out every year, the Half Marathon sees some 16,000 participants (making it the biggest half marathon in South Africa), while 11,000 athletes tackle the 56 km Ultra Marathon.

In addition to the main events, other events take place the day before (Good Friday):
Approximately 6 000 runners - including toddlers and young children with their families - take part in various fun runs
Approximately 1 000 trail runners traverse the trails of the Table Mountain National Park
International participants get to run a scenic 5 km route along the Sea Point promenade as part of the International Friendship Run

The 2020 and 2021 editions of the race were cancelled due to the COVID-19 pandemic.

Winners

Men
Key:

Women
Key:

Halfmarathon 
Key:

References

Two Oceans 56 km. ARRS. Retrieved on 2016-10-13.
Two Oceans 21 km. ARRS. Retrieved on 2016-10-13.

External links
Official web page

Ultramarathons
Half marathons
Recurring sporting events established in 1970
Marathons in South Africa
Athletics competitions in South Africa
Autumn events in South Africa
Sports competitions in Cape Town